Lawyer "Butch" Taylor (born February 11, 1951) is an American retired professional basketball player.

Professional career
In the 1974 NBA Draft, Taylor was selected 55th overall by the Philadelphia 76ers. On 13 September 1974, Taylor signed a multi-year contract with 76ers.

Taylor joined KK Partizan in the 1977–78 season. He was the first foreign basketball player in Yugoslavia, and was signed solely for European competition, as foreign players were not eligible to play in the Yugoslav federal league.

References

1951 births
Living people
American men's basketball players
American expatriate basketball people in Serbia
Basketball players from South Carolina
Centers (basketball)
Gulf Coast State College alumni
Jacksonville Dolphins men's basketball players
Junior college men's basketball players in the United States
KK Partizan players
Philadelphia 76ers draft picks
Sportspeople from Greenville, South Carolina
Greenville Senior High School (Greenville, South Carolina) alumni